The men's 110 metres hurdles event at the 1955 Pan American Games was held at the Estadio Universitario in Mexico City on 16 and 17 March.

Medalists

Results

Heats
Wind:Heat 1: 0.0 m/s, Heat 2: +2.9 m/s

Final
Wind: 0.0 m/s

References

Athletics at the 1955 Pan American Games
1955